Ghana is a multilingual country in which about eighty languages are spoken. Of these, English, which was inherited from the colonial era, is the official language and lingua franca. Of the languages indigenous to Ghana, Akan is the most widely spoken in the south. Dagbani is most widely spoken in the north.

Ghana has more than seventy ethnic groups, each with its own distinct language. Languages that belong to the same ethnic group are usually mutually intelligible. The Dagbanli, Nanumba and Mamprusi languages of Northern Region, are almost the same and, are mutually intelligible with the Frafra and Waali languages of the Upper East and Upper West Regions of Ghana. The Mole-Dagbani languages are spoken by more than 20% of the population.

Eleven languages have the status of government-sponsored languages: three Akan ethnic languages (Akuapem Twi, Asante Twi and Fante) and two Mole-Dagbani ethnic languages (Dagaare and Dagbanli). The others are Ewe, Dangme, Ga, Nzema, Gonja, and Kasem.

In April 2019, the Ghanaian government declared its intention to make French one of Ghana's official languages due to the country being surrounded by Francophone countries (Burkina Faso, the Ivory Coast and Togo) and the presence of a French speaking minority in the country.

Government-sponsored languages
The number of government-sponsored languages is either eleven or nine, depending on whether or not Bono, Akuapem Twi, Asante Twi, and Fante are considered a single language. They are supported by the Bureau of Ghana Languages, which was established in 1951 and publishes materials in the languages; during the periods when Ghanaian languages were used in primary education, these were the languages which were used. All these languages belong to the Niger–Congo language family, though to several different branches.

Akan (Fante, Bono, Asante Twi and Akuapem Twi)

Akan, part of the Kwa branch of the Niger–Congo family, is a dialect continuum, but with regard to official status, only a few out of the many varieties of Akan are recognised: Bono, Fante, Asante Twi, Akuapem Twi. Taken as a whole, Akan is the most-widely spoken language in Ghana.

Ewe
Ewe is a Gbe language, part of the Volta–Niger branch of the Niger–Congo family. The Ewe Language is spoken in Ghana, Togo and Benin with a trace of the language in West Nigeria. Out of the many dialects of Ewe spoken in Ghana, the major ones are Anlo, Tongu, Vedome, Gbi, and Krepi.

Dagbani 
Dagbani is one of the Gur languages. It is the most spoken language in Northern Ghana. The number of native  speakers numbers more than three million, This number will reach six million if dialects such as Nanumba, Mamprusi and Kamara are added. It belongs to the larger Mole-Dagbani ethnic group found in Ghana and makes up about 18.5% of the population. It is spoken by Dagombas in the Northern Region of Ghana..

Dangme
Dangme is one of the Ga–Dangme languages within the Kwa branch. It is spoken in Greater Accra, in south-east Ghana and Togo.

Dagaare
Dagaare is another of the Gur languages. It is spoken in the Upper West Region of Ghana. It is also spoken in Burkina Faso.

Ga
Ga is the other Ga–Dangme language within the Kwa branch. Ga is spoken in south-eastern Ghana, in and around the capital Accra.

Nzema
Nzema is one of the Bia languages, closely related to Akan. It is spoken by the Nzema people in the Western Region of Ghana. It is also spoken in the Ivory Coast.

Kasem
Kasem is a Gurunsi language, in the Gur branch. It is spoken in the Upper Eastern Region of Ghana. It is also spoken in Burkina Faso.

Gonja
Gonja is one of the Guang languages, part of the Tano languages within the Kwa branch along with Akan and Bia. It is spoken in the Northern Region of Ghana and Wa

Languages spoken in Ghana by number of speakers 
This chart reflects data provided by Ethnologue.

Language classification
The language of Ghana belong to the following branches within the Niger–Congo language family:
Kwa languages (Akan, Bia, Guang in Tano; Ga and Adangme)
Gbe languages (Ewe)
Gur languages (Gurunsi, Dagbani, Mossi, Dagaare, and Frafra in Oti–Volta)
Senufo languages (Nafaanra)
Kulango languages
Mande languages (Wangara, Ligbi)

Older classifications may instead group them as Kwa, Gur, and Mande.

See also
Ghana
Demographics of Ghana
Ghanaian English

References

External links
Ethnologue listing for Ghana
Ethnologue map of languages in Ghana
Owu-Ewie, Charles. 2006. The Language Policy of Education in Ghana: A Critical Look at the English-Only Language Policy of Education. In Selected Proceedings of the 35th Annual Conference on African Linguistics, ed. John Mugane et al., 76-85. Somerville, MA: Cascadilla Proceedings Project.
PanAfrican L10n wiki page on Ghana
L'aménagement linguistique dans le monde page on Ghana
GhanaWeb

 
Ghana-related lists